Driza oil field is an Albanian oil field that was discovered in 1939. It is one of the biggest on-shore oil field of Albania. It is situated near the village Drizë, on the southern edge of the city Fier. It began production in 1940 and produces oil.

See also

Oil fields of Albania

References

Oil fields of Albania